Freaky was originally broadcast in 13 half hour blocks with 3 episodes and commercial breaks after each episode.

References

Lists of New Zealand television series episodes